Clara Ingram Judson (May 4, 1879 – May 24, 1960) was an American writer who wrote over 70 children's books, primarily nonfiction including several biographies of American presidents. In 1960, she won the second Laura Ingalls Wilder Medal from the professional children's librarians, although she died before she could receive it. The award recognizes a living author or illustrator whose books, published in the United States, have made "a substantial and lasting contribution to literature for children".

Life
She was born on May 4, 1879, in Logansport, Indiana, and married James McIntosh Judson in 1901. Her first book was Flower Fairies, published in 1915. She wrote 19 volumes in the Mary Jane series, between 1918 and 1939. She was a runner-up for the Newbery Medal three times, in 1951 for Abraham Lincoln, Friend of the People, in 1954 for Theodore Roosevelt, Fighting Patriot, both about US presidents; and in 1957 for Mr. Justice Holmes, about Oliver Wendell Holmes, Jr.

Judson served as the 15th president of the Illinois Woman's Press Association from June 1923 until June 1925. She wrote pieces that appeared in Ladies' Home Journal, Child Life, The American, and The American Legion Weekly.

Her radio program on homemaking debuted in 1928, making her one of the first women "on the air".

She died on May 24, 1960, in Evanston, Illinois, shortly before she would have received the Wilder Medal. That year she also received the inaugural Clara Ingram Judson Award from the Society of Midland Authors, recognizing the most creative writing for children in the Midwest United States.

Awards
 1960, Laura Ingalls Wilder Medal

Selected works

 Flower fairies, illustrated by Maginel Wright Enright (Chicago: Rand McNally, 1915)
 Good-night stories, illus. Clara Powers Wilson (Chicago: A. C. McClurg & Co., 1916)
 Billy Robin and his neighbors, illus. Warner Carr (Rand McNally, 1917)
 Mary Jane's Kindergarten, illus. Frances White (Grosset & Dunlap, 1918)
 The Junior Cook Book (New York, Barse & Hopkins, 1920)
 Mary Jane in Canada, illus. Charles L. Wrenn (NY: Barse & Hopkins, 1924)
 Mary Jane's summer fun, ill. Wrenn (Barse, 1925)
 Virginia Lee, ill. Wrenn (Barse, 1926)
 Mary Jane in Italy, illus. Marie Schubert (NY: Grosset & Dunlap, 1933)
 Mary Jane in Spain, ill. Schubert (Grosset, 1937)

References

External links

 
 
 
 https://web.archive.org/web/20060603164055/http://www.britannica.com/ebi/article-9327809 
 

1879 births
1960 deaths
American children's writers
American historical novelists
Laura Ingalls Wilder Medal winners
Newbery Honor winners
People from Logansport, Indiana
Radio pioneers
American women novelists
Women historical novelists